Ugia scopulina is a species of moth in the family Erebidae. It is found in Uganda.

References

Endemic fauna of Uganda
Moths described in 1926
Ugia
Moths of Africa